Cocoyoc is a city in the north-central part of the Mexican state of Morelos. It is located at 18°53′N 99°04′W. The city lies within the municipality of Yautepec. Cocoyoc reported 10,178 inhabitants in the 2020 census and is the third-largest community in Yautepec.

The name Cocoyoc comes from Nahuatl, meaning ″coyote″.

History
Cocoyoc was founded by the Tlahuicas, the Nahuatl group in the eleventh century, about 200 years before the Aztecs, who would become the dominant group. The Aztecs established their capital in Tenochtitlán, modern is Mexico City. Huitzilihuitl, the second tlatoani (king) of the Aztecs, conquered Cocoyoc (c. 1400) and was so amazed by the ideal climate, fertile land and lush vegetation that he married the daughter of the lord of the conquered region.

Hacienda Cocoyoc was built in the 16th century by the first viceroy of New Spain, Antonio de Mendoza, as chronicled by Pedro Calderón de la Barca (1600-1681). Ownership of the hacienda changed several times, but by the 18th century it had become one of the twelve most important sugar cane mills in the country. In the early 19th century an aqueduct was built for irrigation; the aqueduct is still functional. With the Mexican Revolution it was pillaged and a large portion was destroyed; the lands were distributed to peasants. In 1957, Paulino Rivera Torres bought the hacienda and turned it into a luxury hotel. The hotel has restaurants, a spa, and a golf course.

References

Populated places in Morelos
Nahua settlements